Shuysky Uyezd (Шуйский уезд) was one of the subdivisions of the Vladimir Governorate of the Russian Empire. It was situated in the northern part of the governorate. Its administrative centre was Shuya.

Demographics
At the time of the Russian Empire Census of 1897, Shuysky Uyezd had a population of 158,483. Of these, 99.6% spoke Russian, 0.1% Yiddish, 0.1% German, 0.1% Tatar and 0.1% Polish as their native language.

References

 
Uezds of Vladimir Governorate
Vladimir Governorate